Aslauga ernesti, the western egumbia, is a butterfly in the family Lycaenidae. It is found in Ghana (the Volta Region), Togo and western Nigeria.

References

External links
Images representing Aslauga ernesti at Barcodes of Life

Butterflies described in 1895
Aslauga
Butterflies of Africa